Ashanti may refer to:

 Ashanti people, an ethnic group in West Africa
 Ashanti Empire, a pre-colonial West African state in what is now southern Ghana
 Ashanti dialect or Asante, a literary dialect of the Akan language of southern Ghana
 Ashanti Region, a region within Ghana
 Ashanti (Crown Colony), a United Kingdom colony 1901–1957 in what is now Ghana
 Ashanti (singer) (born 1980), American singer-songwriter and actress
 Ashanti (album), a 2002 album by Ashanti
 Ashanti (1979 film), an American film
 Ashanti (1982 film), an Indian film
 HMS Ashanti (F51), a Tribal-class destroyer launched in 1937
 HMS Ashanti (F117), a Tribal-class frigate launched in 1959

People with the given name
 Ashanti Alston (born 1954), former Black Panther Party member
 Ashanti Johnson, American geochemist and chemical oceanographer

 Ashanti Obi (born 1952), Nigerian sprinter

See also
 Asante (disambiguation)
 Ashanti Gold SC, a football club in Obuasi, Ashanti, Ghana
 Ashanti Goldfields Corporation, a gold mining company
 Bobo Ashanti, one of the Mansions of Rastafari
 Kahlil Ashanti (born 1973), American actor and writer

Language and nationality disambiguation pages